5-12, 5/12, or 5.12 may refer to:

 May 12 (month-day date notation)
 5 December (day-month date notation)

See also
 512 (disambiguation)
 12 May Karachi violence in Pakistan, which took the lives of approximately 30 people
 2008 Sichuan earthquake in China, which took the lives of over 68,000 people and displaced over 1 million